Jonas Mukamba Kadiata Nzemba (born January 4, 1931) is a politician from the Democratic Republic of the Congo and former CEO of the state-run diamond company.
Between August 1965 and October 1968 he was governor in turn of South Kasai, Kasaï-Oriental, Équateur and Orientale Province.
He was again  governor of Équateur Province between 27 August 1980 and 19 March 1983.

Biography

MIBA 

Zaire's president Mobutu Sese Seko appointed Nzemba the chief executive officer of the state's main diamond mining company, the Societé minière de Bakwanga (MIBA) in 1986. Based in the city of Mbuji-Mayi, formerly Bakwanga, the company provided as much as 80 percent of the world's industrial diamonds, but other than mining operations which provided much-needed hard currency, the region was widely neglected by Mobutu and the central government. Throughout the 1980s and 1990s, Zaire and Mobutu paid little attention to Mbuji-Mayi, offering almost no money to build roads, schools or hospitals.

In the political vacuum, MIBA, stepped in. In the place of the federal government, MIBA invested heavily in the region - repairing roads, paying soldiers and supplying water and electricity to the city from its own power station. The company set up a social fund of $5 to $6 million a year, or roughly 8 percent of its annual budget. This money not only went for infrastructure repair, but also to fund a new university.

These investments and position as largest employer made Nzemba one of the most powerful men in the region, and de facto governor of Mbuji-Mayi. Nzemba was considered one of the more powerful players in Mobutu's political party, the Mouvement Populaire pour le Revolution (MPR), but also called himself a "brother" of Étienne Tshisekedi, a popular local political figure and Mobutu's most significant political opposition.

During his time as head of MIBA, Nzemba is credited with creating the Conference pour le Developpement Economique de Kasai Oriental (CDEKO), a regional economic development group in the early 1990s. Nzemba also backed the creation of the University of Kasai, which was jointly sponsored by MIBA and the local Catholic church, and which became the home base of CDEKO. The new organization spearheaded economic growth in Mbuji-Mayi, helping support the development of new agricultural and beer industry expansion around the city, and launched Wetrafa, a locally owned airline.

But, Mobutu's willingness to let Nzemba control the province through MIBA came at a price - Nzemba may have skimmed as much as $1.5 to $2 million a month to send to Mobutu's personal bank accounts.

As the First Congo War broke out, Nzemba initially sided with Mobutu against the rebels led by Laurent-Désiré Kabila, but as Kabila's Alliance of Democratic Forces for the Liberation of Congo-Zaire (AFDL or ADFLC) approached the city, Nzemba quickly switched sides. Nzemba declared that he was ready to work with AFDL a week before the fall of Mbuji-Mayi.

When the city fell to the rebels on April 4, 1997, Nzemba was summoned to Goma to speak with Kabila, who held him for several days, prompting his family to purchase advertising in newspapers publicizing their concerns for his safety. Nzemba was released shortly after, but MIBA began making "voluntary contributions" to Kabila's war effort - totaling an estimated $5.5 million in 1997 and 1998.

Post Civil War 

He ran for president in the 2006 presidential election.

References 

1931 births
Living people
Governors of provinces of the Democratic Republic of the Congo
Candidates for President of the Democratic Republic of the Congo
Governors of Orientale Province
Kasaï-Oriental
Governors of Équateur (former province)
21st-century Democratic Republic of the Congo people